Jean-Charles Falardeau  (1914-1989) was a Canadian sociologist. He was a professor at Université Laval and then President of the Conseil des arts et des lettres du Québec in 1962. He was a Fellow of the Royal Society of Canada and Académie des Sciences Morales et Politiques. He obtained his education from Collège Sainte-Marie de Montrèal and Collège Jean-de-Brébeuf.

References

1914 births
1989 deaths
Academic staff of Université Laval
Canadian sociologists
Université Laval alumni
Officers of the Order of Canada
Presidents of the Canadian Political Science Association
20th-century political scientists